Emmanuel Odafe (born 5 May 1992 in Delta state, Nigeria) is a Nigerian footballer. He currently plays for Plateau United FC, which competes in the Nigerian Professional Football League, the top division in Nigeria. He plays as a striker. A fast and skillful player able to operate at both flanks, Odafo can play as a point man as well; as a left and right side attacker. At Plateau United FC he mainly plays as an attacker in a 4-3-2 formation.

Career 
He began his career in 2007 with his homeclub Emordi Youth Football Academy before leaving in 2008 to FC Ebedei in Ogun State. After one season, he moved in January 2009 to First Bank F.C. in Nigeria Premier League, he managed to convert 15 goals in 23 games played. 
He had a short stay at Plateau United FC 2012-14 before moving to Iraqi Premier League club Kufa FC.

Cihangir GSK (2016-2017) 
In July 2017, Odafe moved to Northern Cyprus where he secure a year contract with Cihangir GSK with an option of renewal at the end of the season but had a short stint. He made 8 appearances for the club in the Süper Lig (previously Birinci Lig).

Back to Plateau United FC (2017)
In the second half of 2017-18 season, Odafe re-joined fellow Nigerian Professional Football League side Plateau United FC, He scored a brace which earned Plateau United three points in their 23rd league match of 2017, as they came from behind to win 2-1 at Sunshine Stars.

Honours

Club
Emordi Youth Football: State Challenge Cup: 2007
Plateau United FC: Nigerian Professional Football League: winners 2017

Individual
Plateau United FC: Player of the month of April (1): 2017

References

External links
 
 
 Emmanuel Odafe at FcTables.com
 
 Plateau United extend NPFL lead, ends Shooting Stars unbeaten run at thenationonlineng.net
 EMMANUEL ODAFE AMOS - YouTube

1992 births
Living people
Nigerian footballers
Association football forwards
Nigeria Professional Football League players
Plateau United F.C. players
Expatriate footballers in Iraq
Nigerian expatriate sportspeople in Iraq
Expatriate footballers in Northern Cyprus
Nigerian expatriate sportspeople in Northern Cyprus